30107 KM is the designation of Russian-built guyed tubular masts for FM-/TV-broadcasting, which were built in the first half of the 1960s at different places in Russia and Ukraine. The 30107 KM-mast has normally a 151 or 182.5 metres high mast body with a wall diameter of 16 – 10 mm, and exists in versions guyed in three and four directions.

Its most unusual feature however, which gives it its characteristic look are the crossbars equipped with a gangway with railing, which run in two levels from the mast structure to each outmost guy. These crossbars are used for oscillation damping of the structure and are used for the installation of antennas.

In the former Soviet Union, guyed tubular masts for broadcasting without these crossbars were also built. However such masts are not something special as such structures also exist in Germany, Czech, Slovakia, France, the United Kingdom, Japan, South Korea, Austria, Sweden, Slovenia and Poland.

30107 KM-masts with crossbars

Other guyed masts with tubular body in the former Soviet Union

External links 
 http://selenatel.ru/masts/masts-review/

Broadcasting standards
Antennas
Standards of Russia